The Ibizan Hound is a lean, agile dog of the hound family. There are two hair types of the breed: smooth and wire. The more commonly seen type is the smooth. Some consider there to be a third type, long, but the longhair is most likely a variation of the wire.

Description

Looks 
The Ibizan Hound is an elegant and agile breed, with an athletic and attractive outline and a ground-covering springy trot. Though graceful in appearance, it has good bone girth and is a rugged/hardy breed. Its large upright ears — a hallmark of the breed — are broad at the base and frame a long and elegant headpiece. The neck is long and lean. It has a unique front assembly with well laid-back shoulders and relatively straight upper arm. Coming in both smooth and wire-coated varieties, their coat is a combination of red and white with the nose, ears, eye rims, and pads of feet being a light tan color. Its eyes are a striking amber color and have an alert and intelligent expression.

Temperament
Ibizan Hounds are intelligent, active, and engaging by nature. They rank 53rd in Stanley Coren's book The Intelligence of Dogs, considered average working/obedience intelligence, but many Ibizan owners enjoy recounting a multitude of examples of their problem-solving abilities. They are true "clowns" of the dog world, delighting in entertaining their people with their antics. Though somewhat independent and stubborn at times, they do take well to training if positive methods are used, but they will balk at punitive training methods. They are generally quiet but will alarm bark if necessary, so they make good watch dogs. They are sensitive hounds, and very good around children and other dogs alike. They generally make good house dogs but are active and athletic, therefore need a lot of daily exercise. They do not make good kennel dogs. Ibizan hounds are sweet, but they are very stubborn and independent.

Ibizan Hounds are "escapologists": they are able to jump incredible heights from a standstill, so they need very tall fences. They also have been known to climb, and many can escape from crates and can open baby gates and even locks. They have a strong prey drive, therefore they cannot be trusted off leash unless in a safely enclosed area. Once off the leash, they might not come back for a long time. A hound that knows where its home is and the surrounding area will usually return unscathed.

Health
The Ibizan Hound is typical of the hound group in that it rarely suffers from hereditary illness. Minor health concerns for the breed include seizures and allergies; very rarely, one will see axonal dystrophy, cataract, retinal dysplasia and deafness in the breed. Ibizan Hound owners should have their dogs' eyes tested by a veterinarian before breeding. CERF and BAER testing is recommended for the breed.  Ibizan Hounds are sensitive to barbiturate anesthesia, and typically live between 12 and 14 years.

History

DNA analysis indicates that the breed was formed recently from other breeds.

The Ibizan Hound is similar in function and type to several breeds, such as the Pharaoh Hound, the Cirneco dell'Etna, the Portuguese Podengo, and the Podenco Canario. The Ibizan Hound is the largest of these breeds, classified by the Fédération Cynologique Internationale as primitive types.

Use
This breed originates in the island of Ibiza and has been traditionally used in the Catalan-speaking areas of Spain, and France where it was known under the name of le charnigue, to hunt rabbits and other small game. The Ibizan Hound is a fast dog that can hunt on all types of terrain, working by scent, sound and sight. Hunters run these dogs in mostly female packs, with perhaps a male or two, as the female is considered the better hunter.

Traditionally a farmer may have one dog and a very well off farmer two dogs to catch rabbits for food. However, in the last twenty years it is seen as a sport where between five and fifteen dogs can be seen in the chase of one rabbit.

The Ibizan Hound authority Miquel Rosselló has provided a detailed description of a working trial which characterises their typical hunting technique and action, strikingly illustrated with action photos by Charles Camberoque which demonstrate hunt behaviour and typical hunt terrain. 
While local hunters will at times use one dog or a brace, and frequently packs of six to eight or as many as fifteen, the working trial requires an evaluation of one or two braces. A brace is called a colla. The couples should be tested on at least two to five rabbits (not hares), without the use of any other hunting aid. An inspection and evaluation of the exterior, fitness, character and obedience of the dogs is recommended prior to the hunt. 
The trial is qualified as having 5 parts. The dogs should show: (1) careful tracking and scenting of the rabbit, without being distracted in the least, 0-30 points; (2) correct signalling of the game, patient stand, strong jump into the air, obedience 0-10 points; (3) chase, giving tongue, speed, sureness, anticipation 0-30 points; (4) putting the game to cover at close quarters, listening, waiting, obedience, correct attack 0-10 point; and (5) good catch, or correct indication of the game's location, retrieval, obedience 0-20 points.

Individual dogs are expected to show a great degree of discipline, obedience and co-operation. They should be extremely agile, have good speed and a powerful vertical jump from a stationary position in rough and often heavily covered ground. They should have excellent scent-tracking abilities, give tongue at the right time when approaching the game closely, and otherwise be silent so that they can locate the game by sound.

In the United States, the Ibizan Hound is frequently competed in lure coursing through the AKC and ASFA, and also competes in LGRA straight racing and NOTRA oval track racing.  Some parts of the country also use them for coursing live prey, generally jackrabbits.

The Ibizan Hound breed is recognized by the Fédération Cynologique Internationale, Continental Kennel Club, American Kennel Club, United Kennel Club, Kennel Club of Great Britain, Canadian Kennel Club, National Kennel Club, New Zealand Kennel Club, Australian National Kennel Council, America's Pet Registry, and American Canine Registry. It was fully recognized by the American Kennel Club in 1979.

In folk culture
According to journalist Norman Lewis, when an owner no longer wants to own one of these dogs (having too much of an appetite, for instance), it is considered very bad luck to kill the dog. Instead, they release the dog on the other side of the island, so that someone else might 'adopt' the animal.

See also
 Dogs portal
 List of dog breeds

References

External links
Sighthound Sanctuary & Animal Services
Ibizan Hound Photos
Charles Camberoque: photos of Ibizans at work
Video: How Ibizans hunt
Ibizan Hound Club (Eivissa)
Norwegian Ibizan Hound Club
Swiss Ibizan Hound Club
German Ibizan Hound Club 
Ibizan Hound Rescue in Spain
Ibizan Hounds in the UK
Additional information on the German language Wikipedia.(In German: "Podenco Ibicenco")

Animals of Ibiza
Dog breeds originating in the Balearic Islands
FCI breeds
Rare dog breeds
Sighthounds